Heer's Department Store, also known as the Greater Heer Store, is a historic Heer's department store building located at Springfield, Greene County, Missouri. It was built in 1915, and is a seven-story commercial building which is sheathed with cream colored terra cotta.  A two-story addition was constructed in 1951.  The building was remodeled in 1967. The store closed in 1995.

It was listed on the National Register of Historic Places in 2002.  It is located in the Springfield Public Square Historic District.

References

Individually listed contributing properties to historic districts on the National Register in Missouri
Commercial buildings on the National Register of Historic Places in Missouri
Commercial buildings completed in 1915
Buildings and structures in Springfield, Missouri
National Register of Historic Places in Greene County, Missouri